The Walter B. Sorrells Cottage is a historic administrative (and formerly residential) building on the campus of the Southeastern Arkansas Community Correction Center in Pine Bluff, Arkansas.  It is a two-story frame building, finished in brick on the first floor and stucco and half-timbering on the second, with Craftsman-style eaves adorned with exposed rafter ends and brackets.  Built in 1920 to a design by Pine Bluff architect Mitchell Seligman, it was the first permanent structure of what was then known as the Boys Industrial School, a state facility for troubled youth.

The building was listed on the National Register of Historic Places in 1986.

See also

National Register of Historic Places listings in Jefferson County, Arkansas

References

Buildings and structures completed in 1920
Buildings and structures in Pine Bluff, Arkansas
Government buildings on the National Register of Historic Places in Arkansas
National Register of Historic Places in Pine Bluff, Arkansas